Andy Murray defeated Novak Djokovic in the final, 7–6(7–4), 7–6(7–5) to win the men's singles tennis title at the 2008 Cincinnati Masters. It was his first Masters title. Rafael Nadal's 32 match winning-streak ended in the semifinals when he was defeated by Djokovic.

Roger Federer was the defending champion, but lost in the third round to Ivo Karlović.

Seeds
The top eight seeds receive a bye into the second round.

Draw

Finals

Top half

Section 1

Section 2

Bottom half

Section 3

Section 4

External links
Draw
Qualifying Draw

Singles